The Our Lady of Rosary Cathedral Also Cafayate Cathedral It is a religious monument of Argentina,  seat of the Catholic bishopric of Cafayate,  suffragan of the archbishopric of Salta. It is located in the city of Cafayate, province of Salta. It is organized in fact as a territorial prelature.

The construction of the structure dates from the year 1885. The objective was to find a new site to replace the old building that was falling into ruins.

The cathedral is made up of five naves. There are only three such structures that survive in South America. The building is dedicated as its name indicates to Our Lady of the Rosary, it follows the Roman or Latin rite and it is under the responsibility of the Bishop Demetrio Jiménez Sánchez-Mariscal.

Gallery

See also
Roman Catholicism in Argentina
Our Lady of Rosary

References

Roman Catholic cathedrals in Argentina
Roman Catholic churches completed in 1885
19th-century Roman Catholic church buildings in Argentina